Warmi Sinqa (Quechua warmi woman, sinqa nose, "woman's nose", also spelled Huarmisenga)  is a mountain in the Andes of Peru which reaches a height of approximately . It lies in the Junín Region, Tarma Province, Tarma District.

References 

Mountains of Peru
Mountains of Junín Region